The 1926 Capital Football season was the first Capital Football season. Burns FC won their first FCTSA League title in their history by an 8-point margin over Molonglo.

1926 FCTSA League

The 1926 FCTSA League is the first season of the FCTSA League, the former top Australian professional soccer league in the Capital Football.

Teams
 Burns
 Canberra
 Capitol Hill
 Molonglo
 Northbourne

League table

Results

1926 FCTSA Cup

The 1926 FCTSA Cup was the first edition of the FCTSA Cup.

First round

Semi-finals

Final

References

External links
 Official Website

1926 in Australian soccer